Chiller (also known as Wes Craven's Chiller) is a 1985 American made-for-television horror film directed by Wes Craven and written by J.D. Feigelson. It follows corporate executive Miles Creighton (Michael Beck), who dies and is cryonically preserved in the hopes that he can be revived. Ten years later, the procedure is a success, and Miles returns, but without his soul. The film premiered on CBS on May 22, 1985.

Plot 

Miles Creighton is cryonically preserved.  When his storage tank malfunctions and begins to thaw, Miles is rushed to a hospital.  His mother, who has missed her son terribly during his 10-year incapacitation, arranges for surgeons there to perform a procedure that was not possible when Miles was originally frozen.  The operation is a success and Miles revives.

Miles returns to the company which his father (now deceased) had started.  He ruthlessly strips down anything that the company does not require to be profitable, and fires the man responsible for keeping the company running in Miles' absence.

A series of mysterious deaths occur and circumstantial evidence implicates Miles.  His mother, of course, does not want to believe her beloved son is a heartless killer.  It is only when Father Penny arrives at the hospital in critical condition that she is convinced her son is evil.  Penny tells her that Miles was responsible, and she rushes home to save her step daughter and have Miles arrested.

The events that follow pit Miles against his mother, and she ends up locking him in a walk-in freezer.  The police arrive and discover that Miles, though apparently frozen, is still alive. His mother comes to the rescue by shooting her son in the chest with a policeman's revolver. At the hospital later, it is implied Miles survived but it is unclear if he will survive the surgery as the techniques to save his life 'aren't quite there yet'.

The final scene is set at the cryogenics facility, where another alarm goes off as another storage tank malfunctions and begins to thaw. This is followed, by several more storage tanks malfunctioning.

Cast 
 Michael Beck as Miles Creighton
 Beatrice Straight as Marion Creighton
 Laura Johnson as Leigh Kenyon
 Dick O'Neill as Clarence Beeson
 Alan Fudge as Dr. Stricklin
 Craig Richard Nelson as Dr. Collier
 Paul Sorvino as Reverend Penny
 Jill Schoelen as Stacey Creighton
 Anne Seymour as Mrs. Bunch
 Russ Marin as Dr. Sample
 Jerry Lacy as Jerry Burley
 Edward Blackoff as 2nd Technician
 Kenneth White as Technician #1
 Ned Wertimer as Mr. Hanna
 Wendy Goldman as Secretary
 Joseph Whipp as Detective
 Brian Libby as Orderly
 Karen Huie as Nurse #1
 Melanie F. Williams as Nurse #2
 Perla Walter as Night Nurse
 Starletta DuPois as Nurse
 Mimi Craven as Nurse Cooper
 Bill Dearth as Officer #1
 Roger Hampton as Officer #2
 Clare Torao as Newscaster (as Clare Nono)
 William Forward as Anesthesiologist

References

External links 

 
 

1985 films
1985 horror films
1985 television films
American horror television films
Cryonics in fiction
Films directed by Wes Craven
American science fiction television films
American science fiction horror films
1980s English-language films
1980s American films